Michael Eamon Hughes (born 2 August 1971) is a Northern Irish football manager, former footballer, who is a majority shareholder and co-owner of NIFL Premiership side Carrick Rangers.

As a player, he was an attacking midfielder who notably played top flight football for Manchester City, West Ham United, Wimbledon and Crystal Palace, including numerous seasons in the Premier League. He also played in Ligue 1 for Strasbourg and in the Football League for  Birmingham City and Coventry City, having initially began his career in Northern Ireland with Carrick Rangers. He finished his career with non-league side St Neots Town. He was capped 71 times by Northern Ireland, scoring five times.

Since retirement, Hughes has returned to Carrick Rangers as first team manager, he has also worked as the clubs chief executive and currently co-owns the club.

Club career

Hughes' career began with Carrick Rangers, before moving to Manchester City as a trainee. In August 1992, he moved to RC Strasbourg for a fee of £450,000. During his four years at Strasbourg, Hughes spent two years on loan to West Ham United. It was during the first of these two loan spells that Hughes would have a say in the outcome of the 1994–95 FA Premier League season. West Ham United were playing at home to Manchester United on the last day of the season. Manchester United's rivals for the title were Blackburn Rovers, who lost against Liverpool on the same day. That meant that had Manchester United beaten West Ham United, they would win the league. However Hughes put West Ham United ahead in the first half and despite a second half equaliser from Brian McClair, West Ham United held out to hand the title to Blackburn Rovers.

West Ham United

In July 1996, Hughes made the move to West Ham United permanent. In the process, he became the first British player to change clubs for free on a Bosman ruling. The following season Joe Kinnear took Hughes to Wimbledon in a £1.6 million deal.

Wimbledon

Hughes became embroiled in a contract dispute between Birmingham City and Wimbledon in 2002. In March 2002, Hughes played three matches for Birmingham on loan, but was injured before the club won promotion to the Premier League and a permanent switch fell through. Wimbledon then refused to take him back. The ensuing dispute over who held his registration continued for over a year and Hughes' career had to be put on hold. In October 2003, Hughes signed for Crystal Palace (who shared Selhurst Park with Wimbledon at the time) and an out-of-court settlement was reached with Birmingham.

Crystal Palace

At Palace, he quickly became a fans' favourite, and, for the 2004–05 season, Hughes was appointed team captain.

Following relegation, he was replaced in the role by defender Fitz Hall (a decision, by the Palace management, which proved unpopular). However, after a run of good form, Hughes was re-appointed team captain, in January 2006. He later lost the captaincy again, this time to Carl Fletcher. He was released by Palace in May 2007.

Peter Taylor commented on Hughes' Palace future claiming that: "Michael Hughes has basically been released, but his is slightly different because I'm really saying that something could also develop later on."

Coventry City

On 6 July 2007, Hughes joined his former manager Iain Dowie at Coventry City, signing a one-year contract.

On 22 May 2008, Michael Hughes was released by Coventry City following the expiry of his contract, having made 18 first team appearances during the 2007–08 season. Hughes fell out of favour with new Coventry manager Chris Coleman who eventually decided not to renew his contract.

St Neots Town

In March 2009, Michael joined St Neots Town as player-coach, working alongside former international teammate Steve Lomas.

International career
Hughes won 71 international caps with the Northern Ireland national team, scoring five times.

Managerial career
Hughes was appointed caretaker manager of Carrick Rangers after the sacking of Stephen Small. On 23 September 2013, Hughes stepped down as manager and was replaced by Gary Haveron. Hughes retained his position as the club's chief executive and majority shareholder.

International goals
Scores and results list Northern Ireland's goal tally first.

References

External links

1971 births
Living people
People from Larne
Association footballers from Northern Ireland
Northern Ireland international footballers
Northern Ireland under-21 international footballers
Association football midfielders
Manchester City F.C. players
RC Strasbourg Alsace players
West Ham United F.C. players
Wimbledon F.C. players
Birmingham City F.C. players
Crystal Palace F.C. players
Coventry City F.C. players
St Neots Town F.C. players
English Football League players
Premier League players
Ligue 1 players
Expatriate footballers in France
British football chairmen and investors
Carrick Rangers F.C. players
Sportspeople from County Antrim
Expatriate association footballers from Northern Ireland
Expatriate sportspeople from Northern Ireland in France